Bhartrdaman was a Saka ruler of the Western Kshatrapas in northwestern India from around 278 to 295. For the first four years, his coins name him only as kshatrapa, after which time his coins name him mahakshatrapa. He was the second of two sons of Rudrasena II who came to the throne, after his brother Visvasimha, and was among the last rulers of the Kardamaka dynasty.

References

External links
 Coins of Bhartrdaman

Western Satraps
3rd-century monarchs in Asia
Year of birth unknown
Year of death unknown
3rd-century Indian monarchs